1940s in fashion may refer to:

 1930–45 in fashion
 1945–60 in fashion

1940s decade overviews